The Algardi Firedogs  (French - chenets de l'Algarde) are two small bronze sculptural groups, individually entitled Jupiter holding his thunderbolt, seated on a terrestrial globe supported by three Titans and Juno carried by the winds.

Originals
The originals were commissioned as the fronts of andirons or firedogs from the Roman sculptor Alessandro Algardi for Philip IV of Spain by Diego Velázquez in 1650 whilst he was Spanish ambassador to the Italian states, and he ordered four bronzes symbolizing the four elements of the court of Spain. Though they were incomplete on his death and had to be completed by his pupils. He had only completed the first two in a planned set of four before his death and so the other two (Neptune carried by the waters and Cybele carried by the earth) were produced by his children. Philip did not use them as firedogs but as decorative elements for the garden of his Aranjuez Palace.

France

Other 17th century foundries produced copies for other royal courts, especially the Juno and Jupiter. For example, a set of these two was delivered to the Palace of Versailles in 1684. Louis XIV placed them in niches in the oval salon, but Louis XV passed them to the marquis de Marigny, director of the Bâtiments du roi, who displayed them in the château de Ménars. After the marquis' death, they were moved to the Louvre in 1795, before being converted to support a pendulum clock at Napoleon's palace of château de Saint-Cloud. The two groups were then moved to the palais des Tuileries, where in 1845 they were part-gilded by Charles Christofle. The Juno is now lost, but the Jupiter is now on display in the Louvre.

Two similar Juno and Jupiter groups were also owned by the Grand Dauphin, initially displaying them in the château de Choisy then from 1695 in the château de Meudon.

Selected examples
Wallace Collection, London - pair, one of the Grand Dauphin's sets
Metropolitan Museum of Art, New York - one, plus a pair of later copies, probably 18th-century. 
Springfield Museum of Art, Massachusetts - one work
Pavlovsk Palace, St Petersburg - one work

References

17th-century sculptures
Bronze sculptures
Baroque sculptures
Sculptures of Jupiter (mythology)
Sculptures of Hera
Italian sculptures of the Louvre
Collection of the Wallace Collection
Metalwork of the Metropolitan Museum of Art